The grave statue of a youth from Tenea known as the Kouros of Tenea (formerly Apollo of Tenea) is now located in the Glyptothek in Munich, Germany.

The archaic Kouros was created in North-East Peloponnese about 560 BC. The Parian marble statue was discovered in 1846, approximately twenty kilometers South of Ancient Corinth at the site of ancient Tenea. The Kouros was acquired by the Glyptothek in 1853.

External links
 The statue's entry at the Glyptothek
 Reconstructed version in polychrome

References

Archaic Greek sculptures
6th-century BC Greek sculptures
Tenea
Collection of the Glyptothek